Maazel is a surname. Notable people with the surname include:

 Fiona Maazel (born 1975), American writer, daughter of Lorin Maazel
 Lorin Maazel (1930–2014), American conductor, violinist and composer
Lincoln Maazel (1903-2009), American actor, father of Lorin

See also
Mazel, a surname

Jewish surnames
Yiddish-language surnames